O Sonfa (呉 善花, Japanese: , born 15 September 1956), commonly known as her Korean name Oh Seon-hwa, is a professor in the School of International Relations at Takushoku University in Tokyo, she is also active as an author and journalist in Japan. She is a critic in many fields such as current issues, history, and culture, particularly in East Asian Countries. Originally from Jeju-do, South Korea, she left for Japan in 1983 and received a BA degree from Daito Bunka University and an MA degree from the Graduate School of North American Studies at Tokyo University of Foreign Studies. She went on to naturalise as a Japanese citizen.

In 1998, she lost her South Korean nationality as she had acquired Japanese nationality in 1991(Korean-Japanese). In 2007 and 2013, she was refused entry to South Korea.

Publications
Getting Over It! Why Korea Needs to Stop Bashing Japan. Tachibana Publishing: 2015
What Makes Korea Insult Japan: Truth Behind Korea's Resentment Over Japan. Hikaruland Publishing Co. Ltd.: 2017

See also 
 Kim Wan-seop
 Pak Noja
Korean studies

Notes

External links 
 Profile

1956 births
Anti-South Korean sentiment
Academic staff of Takushoku University
Japanese nationalists
Japanese people of Korean descent
South Korean emigrants to Japan
Living people
Naturalized citizens of Japan
People from Jeju Province
Japanese critics